Indiana state elections in 2020 was held on Tuesday, November 3, 2020. The primary elections were held on June 2, 2020. Primary candidates for the 2020 Attorney General election were not selected in the primary but in a primary convention on June 20, 2020.

In addition to the U.S. presidential race, Indiana voters elected the Governor of Indiana, two of Indiana's executive officers, all of Indiana's seats to the House of Representatives, all of the seats of the Indiana House of Representatives, and 25 of 50 seats in the Indiana Senate. Neither of the state's two U.S. Senate seats were up for election in 2020.

Federal offices

President of the United States

Indiana, a stronghold for the Republican Party and thus a reliable red state, had 11 electoral votes in the Electoral College. Republican Donald Trump won all of them with 57% of the popular vote.

United States House of Representatives

There are 9 U.S. Representatives in Indiana that were up for election. Republicans won 7 of them while Democrats won 2. No seats changed hands.

State executive offices

Governor

The position of the Governor of Indiana was up for election. Incumbent Republican Eric Holcomb won re-election with 57% of the votes.

Attorney General

The position of the Indiana Attorney General was up for election. Incumbent Republican Todd Rokita won election with 58% of the votes.

State legislature
All 100 seats of the Indiana House of Representatives and 25 of 50 seats of the Indiana Senate were up for election.

Senate

Before the election the composition of the state senate was:

After the election, the composition was:

House of Representatives

Before the election the composition of the state house was:

After the election, the composition was:

Notes

Partisan clients

References

External links
 Indiana Secretary of State Voter Portal
 
 
  (State affiliate of the U.S. League of Women Voters)
 
 . (Guidance to help voters get to the polls; addresses transport, childcare, work, information challenges)

 
Indiana